Jony is a masculine given name or nickname (often of Jonathan) and a surname. Notable people with the name include:
 JONY (real name — Jahid Afrail oglu Huseynli (born  29 February 1996, Baku, Azerbaijan), Azerbaijani-Russian singer  and  songwriter.
 Jony Fragnoli (born 1989), Swiss footballer
 Jony Ive (born 1967), British industrial designer primarily known for his work at Apple
 Jony López (born 1987), Spanish football defender
 Jony Marcos (born 1977), Brazilian politician and pastor
 Jony Ramos (born 1986), São Tomé and Príncipe football forward
 Jony Rodríguez (born 1991), Spanish football winger
 Jony Talukdar (born 1993), Bangladeshi cricketer
 Jony (footballer, born 1985), Spanish footballer Jonathan Ñíguez Esclápez
 Jony (footballer, born 1994), Argentine footballer Jonathan Diego Menéndez
 Masuk Mia Jony (born 1998), Bangladeshi footballer

See also
 Gini & Jony, Indian children's fashion brand
 Joni (disambiguation)
 Jonny
 Johny (disambiguation)
 Jonie

Masculine given names
Hypocorisms